The 1976 California Angels season involved the Angels finishing fourth in the American League West with a record of 76 wins and 86 losses.

After a concert by The Who in March, groundskeepers reported that more than 100 marijuana plants sprouted on the playing field of Anaheim Stadium.

Offseason 
 January 7, 1976: Ernie Camacho was drafted by the Angels in the 4th round of the secondary phase of the January 1976 Major League Baseball draft, but did not sign.
 March 3, 1976: John Balaz, Dick Sharon, and Dave Machemer were traded by the Angels to the Boston Red Sox for Dick Drago.

Regular season 
 July 20, 1976: Hank Aaron of the Milwaukee Brewers hit the 755th and final home run of his career off Angels pitcher Dick Drago.
 August 31, 1976: Angels pitcher Nolan Ryan struck out Ron LeFlore of the Detroit Tigers for the 2000th strikeout of his career.
 September 10, 1976: Nolan Ryan had 18 strikeouts in one game.

Season standings

Record vs. opponents

Notable transactions 
 May 17, 1976: Bobby Jones was selected off waivers by the Angels from the Texas Rangers.
 June 6, 1976: Ed Herrmann was traded by the Angels to the Houston Astros for Terry Humphrey and Mike Barlow.

Draft picks 
 June 8, 1976: 1976 Major League Baseball draft
Ken Landreaux was drafted by the Angels in the 1st round (6th pick).
Danny Boone was drafted by the Angels in the 2nd round of the secondary phase, but did not sign.

Roster

Player stats

Batting

Starters by position 
Note: Pos = Position; G = Games played; AB = At bats; H = Hits; Avg. = Batting average; HR = Home runs; RBI = Runs batted in

Other batters 
Note: G = Games played; AB = At bats; H = Hits; Avg. = Batting average; HR = Home runs; RBI = Runs batted in

Pitching

Starting pitchers 
Note: G = Games pitched; IP = Innings pitched; W = Wins; L = Losses; ERA = Earned run average; SO = Strikeouts

Other pitchers 
Note: G = Games pitched; IP = Innings pitched; W = Wins; L = Losses; ERA = Earned run average; SO = Strikeouts

Relief pitchers 
Note: G = Games pitched; W = Wins; L = Losses; SV = Saves; ERA = Earned run average; SO = Strikeouts

Farm system

Notes

References

External links 
1976 California Angels at Baseball-Reference
1976 California Angels at Baseball Almanac

Los Angeles Angels seasons
California Angels season
Los